Sir Edward Sherlock Gooch, 6th Baronet of Benacre Hall (6 June 1802 – 9 November 1856) was a British Conservative politician.

Life

Born in 1802, Gooch was the son of Sir Thomas Gooch, 5th Baronet and Marianne née Whittaker. He first married Louisa Anna Maria Prescott, daughter of Sir George Beeston Prescott, 2nd Baronet, in 1828, and they had at least two children: Florence Jane Charlotte Giva Gooch (died 1918) and a second, unknown daughter.

After Louisa's death in 1837, in 1839 he married Harriet Hope-Vere, daughter of James Joseph Hope-Vere and his wife, Lady Elizabeth Hay. They had nine children: Elizabeth Gooch; Diana Anne Gooch (died 1928); Harriet Sophia Gooch (died 1927); Charlotte Matilda Gooch; Isabel Edith Gooch (died 1931); Edward Sherlock Gooch (1843–1872); Francis Robert Sherlock Lambert Gooch (1850–1881); Alfred Sherlock Gooch (1851–1899); and another unknown son, born between 1844 and 1849.

Gooch was elected MP for East Suffolk at a by-election in 1846—caused by the resignation of John Henniker-Major—and held the seat until his death in 1856.

He succeeded to the Baronetcy of Benacre Hall upon the death of his father, Sir Thomas Gooch, 5th Baronet. Upon his own death in 1856, his son Sir Edward Sherlock Gooch, 7th Baronet succeeded to the peerage.

Arms

References

External links
 

UK MPs 1841–1847
UK MPs 1852–1857
Conservative Party (UK) MPs for English constituencies
1802 births
1856 deaths
Baronets in the Baronetage of Great Britain